NGC 1614 is the New General Catalogue identifier for a spiral galaxy in the equatorial constellation  of Eridanus. It was discovered on December 29, 1885 by American astronomer Lewis Swift, who described it in a shorthand notation as: pretty faint, small, round, a little brighter middle. The nebula was then catalogued by Danish-Irish astronomer J. L. E. Drayer in 1888. When direct photography became available, it was noted that this galaxy displayed some conspicuous peculiarities. American astronomer Halton Arp included it in his 1966 Atlas of Peculiar Galaxies. In 1971, Swiss astronomer Fritz Zwicky described it as a "blue post-eruptive galaxy, compact patchy core, spiral plumes, long blue jet SSW".

In the De Vaucouleurs system for classifying galaxies, NGC 1614 has a galaxy morphological classification of SB(s)c pec. The SB indicates this is a barred spiral galaxy, while the '(s)' means it lacks a ring-like structure around the nucleus. The trailing 'c' describes the spiral arm structure as being loosely wound. The peculiar nature of the galaxy is noted with the 'pec.' abbreviation. The galaxy is bright at the center, with two nearly symmetrical inner spiral arms.

This galaxy is undergoing a minor merger event with a gas-rich, low-mass companion galaxy, located in a tidal tail to the southwest of the nucleus. The main galaxy is estimated to be around 3−5 times as massive as the merging object. The interaction between the two galaxies is triggering a burst of star formation in NGC 1614, although not apparently an active galactic nucleus. It is described as "one of the most extreme nearby starbursts".

In the core region, a 230 pc radius ring feature has formed around the nucleus within the last 5−10 million years from an inflow of gas caused by the merger event, and this structure is the site of the intense star forming activity known as a starburst region. This activity is bright enough that it is masking whatever weak nuclear emission there is coming from the core. The nucleus itself displays evidence of an older starburst event. The starburst activity is presumed to be driving an observed outflow of cold molecular gas that has a combined mass of around 32 million times the mass of the Sun.

References

External links

 

Eridanus (constellation)
1614
Barred spiral galaxies
Starburst galaxies
Peculiar galaxies
Luminous infrared galaxies
186
15538
Markarian 0617